The Reformation (alternatively named the Protestant Reformation or the European Reformation) was a major movement within Western Christianity in 16th-century Europe that posed a religious and political challenge to the Catholic Church and in particular to papal authority, arising from what were perceived to be errors, abuses, and discrepancies by the Catholic Church. The Reformation was the start of Protestantism and the split of the Western Church into Protestantism and what is now the Roman Catholic Church. It is also considered to be one of the events that signified the end of the Middle Ages and the beginning of the early modern period in Europe.

Prior to Martin Luther and the other Protestant Reformers, there were earlier reform movements within Western Christianity. Although the Reformation is usually considered to have started with the publication of the Ninety-five Theses by Martin Luther in 1517, he was not excommunicated by Pope Leo X until January 1521. The Diet of Worms of May 1521 condemned Luther and officially banned citizens of the Holy Roman Empire from defending or propagating his ideas. The spread of Gutenberg's printing press provided the means for the rapid dissemination of religious materials in the vernacular. Luther survived after being declared an outlaw due to the protection of Elector Frederick the Wise. The initial movement in Germany diversified, and other reformers such as Huldrych Zwingli and John Calvin arose. In general, the Reformers argued that salvation in Christianity was a completed status based on faith in Jesus alone and not a process that requires good works, as in the Catholic view. Key events of the period include: Diet of Worms (1521), formation of the Lutheran Duchy of Prussia (1525), English Reformation (1529 onwards), the Council of Trent (1545–63), the Peace of Augsburg (1555), the excommunication of Elizabeth I (1570), Edict of Nantes (1598) and Peace of Westphalia (1648). The Counter-Reformation, also called the Catholic Reformation or the Catholic Revival, was the period of Catholic reforms initiated in response to the Protestant Reformation. The end of the Reformation era is disputed among modern scholars.

Overview 
Movements had been made towards a Reformation prior to Martin Luther, so some Protestants, such as Landmark Baptists, and the tradition of the Radical Reformation prefer to credit the start of the Reformation to reformers such as Arnold of Brescia, Peter Waldo, John Wycliffe, Jan Hus, Petr Chelčický, and Girolamo Savonarola. Due to the reform efforts of Hus and other Bohemian reformers, Utraquist Hussitism was acknowledged by the Council of Basel and was officially tolerated in the Crown of Bohemia, although other movements were still subject to persecution, including the Lollards in England and the Waldensians in France and Italian regions.

Luther began by criticising the sale of indulgences, insisting that the Pope had no authority over purgatory and that the Treasury of Merit had no foundation in the Bible. The Reformation developed further to include a distinction between Law and Gospel, a complete reliance on Scripture as the only source of proper doctrine (sola scriptura) and the belief that faith in Jesus is the only way to receive God's pardon for sin (sola fide) rather than good works. Although this is generally considered a Protestant belief, a similar formulation was taught by Molinist and Jansenist Catholics. The priesthood of all believers downplayed the need for saints or priests to serve as mediators, and mandatory clerical celibacy was ended. Simul justus et peccator implied that although people could improve, no one could become good enough to earn forgiveness from God. Sacramental theology was simplified and attempts at imposing Aristotelian epistemology were resisted.

Luther and his followers did not see these theological developments as changes. The 1530 Augsburg Confession concluded that "in doctrine and ceremonies nothing has been received on our part against Scripture or the Church Catholic", and even after the Council of Trent, Martin Chemnitz published the 1565–73 Examination of the Council of Trent as an attempt to prove that Trent innovated on doctrine while the Lutherans were following in the footsteps of the Church Fathers and Apostles.

The initial movement in Germany diversified, and other reformers arose independently of Luther such as Zwingli in Zürich and John Calvin in Geneva. Depending on the country, the Reformation had varying causes and different backgrounds and also unfolded differently than in Germany. The spread of Gutenberg's printing press provided the means for the rapid dissemination of religious materials in the vernacular.

During Reformation-era confessionalization, Western Christianity adopted different confessions (Catholic, Lutheran, Reformed, Anglican, Anabaptist, Unitarian, etc.). Radical Reformers, besides forming communities outside state sanction, sometimes employed more extreme doctrinal change, such as the rejection of the tenets of the councils of Nicaea and Chalcedon with the Unitarians of Transylvania. Anabaptist movements were especially persecuted following the German Peasants' War.

Leaders within the Roman Catholic Church responded with the Counter-Reformation, initiated by the Confutatio Augustana in 1530, the Council of Trent in 1545, the formation of the Jesuits in 1540, the Defensio Tridentinæ fidei in 1578, and also a series of wars and expulsions of Protestants that continued until the 19th century. Northern Europe, with the exception of most of Ireland, came under the influence of Protestantism. Southern Europe remained predominantly Catholic apart from the much-persecuted Waldensians. Central Europe was the site of much of the Thirty Years' War and there were continued expulsions of Protestants in Central Europe up to the 19th century. Following World War II, the removal of ethnic Germans to either East Germany or Siberia reduced Protestantism in the Warsaw Pact countries, although some remain today.

The absence of Protestants, however, does not necessarily imply a failure of the Reformation. Although Protestants were excommunicated and ended up worshipping in communions separate from Catholics (contrary to the original intention of the Reformers), they were also suppressed and persecuted in most of Europe at one point. As a result, some of them lived as crypto-Protestants, also called Nicodemites, contrary to the urging of John Calvin, who wanted them to live their faith openly. Some crypto-Protestants have been identified as late as the 19th century after immigrating to Latin America.

History

Origins and early history

Earlier reform movements 

John Wycliffe questioned the privileged status of the clergy which had bolstered their powerful role in England and the luxury and pomp of local parishes and their ceremonies. In 1374, Catherine of Siena began travelling with her followers throughout northern and central Italy advocating reform of the clergy and advising people that repentance and renewal could be done through "the total love for God." She carried on a long correspondence with Pope Gregory XI, asking him to reform the clergy and the administration of the Papal States. The oldest Protestant churches, such as the Moravian Church, date their origins to Jan Hus (John Huss) in the early 15th century. As it was led by a Bohemian noble majority, and recognised, for some time, by the Basel Compacts, the Hussite Reformation was Europe's first "Magisterial Reformation" because the ruling magistrates supported it, unlike the "Radical Reformation", which the state did not support.

Common factors that played a role during the Reformation and the Counter-Reformation included the rise of the printing press, nationalism, simony, the appointment of Cardinal-nephews, and other corruption of the Roman Curia and other ecclesiastical hierarchy, the impact of humanism, the new learning of the Renaissance versus scholasticism, and the Western Schism that eroded loyalty to the Papacy. Unrest due to the Great Schism of Western Christianity (1378–1416) excited wars between princes, uprisings among the peasants, and widespread concern over corruption in the Church, especially from John Wycliffe at Oxford University and from Jan Hus at the Charles University in Prague.

Hus objected to some of the practices of the Roman Catholic Church and wanted to return the church in Bohemia and Moravia to earlier practices: liturgy in the language of the people (i.e. Czech), having lay people receive communion in both kinds (bread and wine—that is, in Latin, communio sub utraque specie), married priests, and eliminating indulgences and the concept of purgatory. Some of these, like the use of local language as the liturgical language, were approved by the pope as early as in the 9th century.

The leaders of the Roman Catholic Church condemned him at the Council of Constance (1414–1417) and he was burnt at the stake, despite a promise of safe-conduct. Wycliffe was posthumously condemned as a heretic and his corpse exhumed and burned in 1428. The Council of Constance confirmed and strengthened the traditional medieval conception of church and empire. The council did not address the national tensions or the theological tensions stirred up during the previous century and could not prevent schism and the Hussite Wars in Bohemia.

Pope Sixtus IV (1471–1484) established the practice of selling indulgences to be applied to the dead, thereby establishing a new stream of revenue with agents across Europe. Pope Alexander VI (1492–1503) was one of the most controversial of the Renaissance popes. He was the father of seven children, including Lucrezia and Cesare Borgia. In response to papal corruption, particularly the sale of indulgences, Luther wrote The Ninety-Five Theses.

A number of theologians in the Holy Roman Empire preached reformation ideas in the 1510s, shortly before or simultaneously with Luther, including Christoph Schappeler in Memmingen (as early as 1513).

Magisterial Reformation 

The Reformation is usually dated to 31 October 1517 in Wittenberg, Saxony, when Luther sent his Ninety-Five Theses on the Power and Efficacy of Indulgences to the Archbishop of Mainz. The theses debated and criticised the Church and the papacy, but concentrated upon the selling of indulgences and doctrinal policies about purgatory, particular judgment, and the authority of the pope. He would later in the period 1517–1521 write works on devotion to Virgin Mary, the intercession of and devotion to the saints, the sacraments, mandatory clerical celibacy, and later on the authority of the pope, the ecclesiastical law, censure and excommunication, the role of secular rulers in religious matters, the relationship between Christianity and the law, good works, and monasticism. Some nuns, such as Katharina von Bora and Ursula of Munsterberg, left the monastic life when they accepted the Reformation, but other orders adopted the Reformation, as Lutherans continue to have monasteries today. In contrast, Reformed cities typically secularised monastic property.

Reformers and their opponents made heavy use of inexpensive pamphlets as well as vernacular Bibles using the relatively new printing press, so there was swift movement of both ideas and documents. Magdalena Heymair printed pedagogical writings for teaching children Bible stories.

Parallel to events in Germany, a movement began in Switzerland under the leadership of Huldrych Zwingli. These two movements quickly agreed on most issues, but some unresolved differences kept them separate. Some followers of Zwingli believed that the Reformation was too conservative, and moved independently toward more radical positions, some of which survive among modern day Anabaptists.

After this first stage of the Reformation, following the excommunication of Luther in Decet Romanum Pontificem and the condemnation of his followers by the edicts of the 1521 Diet of Worms, the work and writings of John Calvin were influential in establishing a loose consensus among various churches in Switzerland, Scotland, Hungary, Germany and elsewhere.

Although the German Peasants' War of 1524–1525 began as a tax and anti-corruption protest as reflected in the Twelve Articles, its leader Thomas Müntzer gave it a radical Reformation character. It swept through the Bavarian, Thuringian and Swabian principalities, including the Black Company of Florian Geier, a knight from Giebelstadt who joined the peasants in the general outrage against the Catholic hierarchy. In response to reports about the destruction and violence, Luther condemned the revolt in writings such as Against the Murderous, Thieving Hordes of Peasants; Zwingli and Luther's ally Philipp Melanchthon also did not condone the uprising. Some 100,000 peasants were killed by the end of the war.

Radical Reformation 

The Radical Reformation was the response to what was believed to be the corruption in both the Roman Catholic Church and the Magisterial Reformation. Beginning in Germany and Switzerland in the 16th century, the Radical Reformation developed radical Protestant churches throughout Europe. The term includes Thomas Müntzer, Andreas Karlstadt, the Zwickau prophets, and Anabaptists like the Hutterites and Mennonites.

In parts of Germany, Switzerland, and Austria, a majority sympathised with the Radical Reformation despite intense persecution. Although the surviving proportion of the European population that rebelled against Catholic, Lutheran and Zwinglian churches was small, Radical Reformers wrote profusely and the literature on the Radical Reformation is disproportionately large, partly as a result of the proliferation of the Radical Reformation teachings in the United States.

Despite significant diversity among the early Radical Reformers, some "repeating patterns" emerged among many Anabaptist groups. Many of these patterns were enshrined in the Schleitheim Confession (1527) and include believers' (or adult) baptism, memorial view of the Lord's Supper, belief that Scripture is the final authority on matters of faith and practice, emphasis on the New Testament and the Sermon on the Mount, interpretation of Scripture in community, separation from the world and a two-kingdom theology, pacifism and nonresistance, communal ownership and economic sharing, belief in the freedom of the will, non-swearing of oaths, "yieldedness" (Gelassenheit) to one's community and to God, the ban (i.e., shunning), salvation through divinization (Vergöttung) and ethical living, and discipleship (Nachfolge Christi).

Literacy 

The Protestant Reformation was a triumph of literacy and the new printing press. Luther's translation of the Bible into High German (the New Testament was published in 1522; the Old Testament was published in parts and completed in 1534) was also decisive for the German language and its evolution from Early New High German to Modern Standard German. Luther's translation of the Bible promoted the development of non-local forms of language and exposed all speakers to forms of German from outside their own area. The publication of Luther's Bible was a decisive moment in the spread of literacy in early modern Germany, and stimulated as well the printing and distribution of religious books and pamphlets. From 1517 onward, religious pamphlets flooded Germany and much of Europe.

By 1530, over 10,000 publications are known, with a total of ten million copies. The Reformation was thus a media revolution. Luther strengthened his attacks on Rome by depicting a "good" against "bad" church. From there, it became clear that print could be used for propaganda in the Reformation for particular agendas, although the term propaganda derives from the Catholic Congregatio de Propaganda Fide (Congregation for Propagating the Faith) from the Counter-Reformation. Reform writers used existing styles, cliches and stereotypes which they adapted as needed. Especially effective were writings in German, including Luther's translation of the Bible, his Smaller Catechism for parents teaching their children, and his Larger Catechism, for pastors.

Using the German vernacular they expressed the Apostles' Creed in simpler, more personal, Trinitarian language. Illustrations in the German Bible and in many tracts popularised Luther's ideas. Lucas Cranach the Elder (1472–1553), the great painter patronised by the electors of Wittenberg, was a close friend of Luther, and he illustrated Luther's theology for a popular audience. He dramatised Luther's views on the relationship between the Old and New Testaments, while remaining mindful of Luther's careful distinctions about proper and improper uses of visual imagery.

Causes of the Reformation 

The following supply-side factors have been identified as causes of the Reformation:
 The presence of a printing press in a city by 1500 made Protestant adoption by 1600 far more likely.
 Protestant literature was produced at greater levels in cities where media markets were more competitive, making these cities more likely to adopt Protestantism.
 Ottoman incursions decreased conflicts between Protestants and Catholics, helping the Reformation take root.
 Greater political autonomy increased the likelihood that Protestantism would be adopted.
 Where Protestant reformers enjoyed princely patronage, they were much more likely to succeed.
 Proximity to neighbours who adopted Protestantism increased the likelihood of adopting Protestantism.
 Cities that had higher numbers of students enrolled in heterodox universities and lower numbers enrolled in orthodox universities were more likely to adopt Protestantism.

The following demand-side factors have been identified as causes of the Reformation:
 Cities with strong cults of saints were less likely to adopt Protestantism.
 Cities where primogeniture was practised were less likely to adopt Protestantism.
 Regions that were poor but had great economic potential and bad political institutions were more likely to adopt Protestantism.
 The presence of bishoprics made the adoption of Protestantism less likely.
 The presence of monasteries made the adoption of Protestantism less likely.
A 2020 study linked the spread of Protestantism to personal ties to Luther (e.g. letter correspondents, visits, former students) and trade routes.

Reformation in Germany 

In 1517, Luther nailed the Ninety-five theses to the Castle Church door, and without his knowledge or prior approval, they were copied and printed across Germany and internationally. Different reformers arose more or less independently of Luther in 1518 (for example Andreas Karlstadt, Philip Melanchthon, Erhard Schnepf, Johannes Brenz and Martin Bucer) and in 1519 (for example Huldrych Zwingli, Nikolaus von Amsdorf, Ulrich von Hutten), and so on.

After the Heidelberg Disputation (1518) where Luther described the Theology of the Cross as opposed to the Theology of Glory and the Leipzig Disputation (1519), the faith issues were brought to the attention of other German theologians throughout the Empire. Each year drew new theologians to embrace the Reformation and participate in the ongoing, European-wide discussion about faith. The pace of the Reformation proved unstoppable by 1520.

The early Reformation in Germany mostly concerns the life of Martin Luther until he was excommunicated by Pope Leo X on 3 January 1521, in the bull Decet Romanum Pontificem. The exact moment Martin Luther realised the key doctrine of Justification by Faith is described in German as the Turmerlebnis. In Table Talk, Luther describes it as a sudden realization. Experts often speak of a gradual process of realization between 1514 and 1518.

Reformation ideas and Protestant church services were first introduced in cities, being supported by local citizens and also some nobles. The Reformation did not receive overt state support until 1525, although it was only due to the protection of Elector Frederick the Wise (who had a strange dream the night prior to 31 October 1517) that Luther survived after being declared an outlaw, in hiding at Wartburg Castle and then returning to Wittenberg. It was more of a movement among the German people between 1517 and 1525, and then also a political one beginning in 1525. Reformer Adolf Clarenbach was burned at the stake near Cologne in 1529.

The first state to formally adopt a Protestant confession was the Duchy of Prussia (1525). Albert, Duke of Prussia formally declared the "Evangelical" faith to be the state religion. Catholics labeled self-identified Evangelicals "Lutherans" to discredit them after the practice of naming a heresy after its founder. However, the Lutheran Church traditionally sees itself as the "main trunk of the historical Christian Tree" founded by Christ and the Apostles, holding that during the Reformation, the Church of Rome fell away. Ducal Prussia was followed by many imperial free cities and other minor imperial entities. The next sizable territories were the Landgraviate of Hesse (1526; at the Synod of Homberg) and the Electorate of Saxony (1527; Luther's homeland), Electoral Palatinate (1530s), and the Duchy of Württemberg (1534). For a more complete list, see the list of states by the date of adoption of the Reformation and the table of the adoption years for the Augsburg Confession. The reformation wave swept first the Holy Roman Empire, and then extended beyond it to the rest of the European continent.

Germany was home to the greatest number of Protestant reformers. Each state which turned Protestant had their own reformers who contributed towards the Evangelical faith. In Electoral Saxony the Evangelical-Lutheran Church of Saxony was organised and served as an example for other states, although Luther was not dogmatic on questions of polity.

Reformation outside Germany 

The Reformation also spread widely throughout Europe, starting with Bohemia, in the Czech lands, and, over the next few decades, to other countries.

Austria 

Austria followed the same pattern as the German-speaking states within the Holy Roman Empire, and Lutheranism became the main Protestant confession among its population. Lutheranism gained a significant following in the eastern half of present-day Austria, while Calvinism was less successful. Eventually the expulsions of the Counter-Reformation reversed the trend.

Czech lands 

The Hussites were a Christian movement in the Kingdom of Bohemia following the teachings of Czech reformer Jan Hus.

Jan Hus

Czech reformer and university professor Jan Hus (c. 1369–1415) became the best-known representative of the Bohemian Reformation and one of the forerunners of the Protestant Reformation.

Jan Hus was declared a heretic and executed—burned at stake—at the Council of Constance in 1415 where he arrived voluntarily to defend his teachings.

Hussite movement

This predominantly religious movement was propelled by social issues and strengthened Czech national awareness. In 1417, two years after the execution of Jan Hus, the Czech reformation quickly became the chief force in the country.

Hussites made up the vast majority of the population, forcing the Council of Basel to recognize in 1437 a system of two "religions" for the first time, signing the Compacts of Basel for the kingdom (Catholic and Czech Ultraquism a Hussite movement). Bohemia later also elected two Protestant kings (George of Poděbrady, Frederick of Palatine).

After Habsburgs took control of the region, the Hussite churches were prohibited and the kingdom partially recatholicised. Even later, Lutheranism gained a substantial following, after being permitted by the Habsburgs with the continued persecution of the Czech native Hussite churches. Many Hussites thus declared themselves Lutherans.

Two churches with Hussite roots are now the second and third biggest churches among the largely agnostic peoples: Czech Brethren (which gave origin to the international church known as the Moravian Church) and the Czechoslovak Hussite Church.

Switzerland 

In Switzerland, the teachings of the reformers and especially those of Zwingli and Calvin had a profound effect, despite frequent quarrels between the different branches of the Reformation.

Huldrych Zwingli 

Parallel to events in Germany, a movement began in the Swiss Confederation under the leadership of Huldrych Zwingli. Zwingli was a scholar and preacher who moved to Zürich—the then-leading city state—in 1518, a year after Martin Luther began the Reformation in Germany with his Ninety-five Theses. Although the two movements agreed on many issues of theology, as the recently introduced printing press spread ideas rapidly from place to place, some unresolved differences kept them separate. Long-standing resentment between the German states and the Swiss Confederation led to heated debate over how much Zwingli owed his ideas to Lutheranism. Although Zwinglianism does hold uncanny resemblance to Lutheranism (it even had its own equivalent of the Ninety-five Theses, called the 67 Conclusions), historians have been unable to prove that Zwingli had any contact with Luther's publications before 1520, and Zwingli himself maintained that he had prevented himself from reading them.

The German Prince Philip of Hesse saw potential in creating an alliance between Zwingli and Luther, seeing strength in a united Protestant front. A meeting was held in his castle in 1529, now known as the Colloquy of Marburg, which has become infamous for its complete failure. The two men could not come to any agreement due to their disputation over one key doctrine. Although Luther preached consubstantiation in the Eucharist over transubstantiation, he believed in the real presence of Christ in the Communion bread. Zwingli, inspired by Dutch theologian Cornelius Hoen, believed that the Communion bread was only representative and memorial—Christ was not present. Luther became so angry that he famously carved into the meeting table in chalk Hoc Est Corpus Meum—a Biblical quotation from the Last Supper meaning "This is my body". Zwingli countered this saying that est in that context was the equivalent of the word significat (signifies).

Some followers of Zwingli believed that the Reformation was too conservative and moved independently toward more radical positions, some of which survive among modern day Anabaptists. One famous incident illustrating this was when radical Zwinglians fried and ate sausages during Lent in Zurich city square by way of protest against the Church teaching of good works. Other Protestant movements grew up along the lines of mysticism or humanism (cf. Erasmus and Louis de Berquin who was martyred in 1529), sometimes breaking from Rome or from the Protestants, or forming outside of the churches.

John Calvin 

Following the excommunication of Luther and condemnation of the Reformation by the Pope, the work and writings of John Calvin were influential in establishing a loose consensus among various churches in Switzerland, Scotland, Hungary, Germany and elsewhere. After the expulsion of its Bishop in 1526, and the unsuccessful attempts of the Berne reformer Guillaume (William) Farel, Calvin was asked to use the organisational skill he had gathered as a student of law to discipline the "fallen city" of Geneva. His "Ordinances" of 1541 involved a collaboration of Church affairs with the City council and consistory to bring morality to all areas of life. After the establishment of the Geneva academy in 1559, Geneva became the unofficial capital of the Protestant movement, providing refuge for Protestant exiles from all over Europe and educating them as Calvinist missionaries. These missionaries dispersed Calvinism widely, and formed the French Huguenots in Calvin's own lifetime and spread to Scotland under the leadership of John Knox in 1560. Anne Locke translated some of Calvin's writings to English around this time. The faith continued to spread after Calvin's death in 1563 and reached as far as Constantinople by the start of the 17th century.

The Reformation foundations engaged with Augustinianism. Both Luther and Calvin thought along lines linked with the theological teachings of Augustine of Hippo. The Augustinianism of the Reformers struggled against Pelagianism, a heresy that they perceived in the Catholic Church of their day. Ultimately, since Calvin and Luther disagreed strongly on certain matters of theology (such as double-predestination and Holy Communion), the relationship between Lutherans and Calvinists was one of conflict.

Nordic countries 

All of Scandinavia ultimately adopted Lutheranism over the course of the 16th century, as the monarchs of Denmark (who also ruled Norway and Iceland) and Sweden (who also ruled Finland) converted to that faith.

Sweden

In Sweden, the Reformation was spearheaded by Gustav Vasa, elected king in 1523, with major contributions by Olaus Petri, a Swedish clergyman. Friction with the pope over the latter's interference in Swedish ecclesiastical affairs led to the discontinuance of any official connection between Sweden and the papacy since 1523. Four years later, at the Diet of Västerås, the king succeeded in forcing the diet to accept his dominion over the national church. The king was given possession of all church property, church appointments required royal approval, the clergy were subject to the civil law, and the "pure Word of God" was to be preached in the churches and taught in the schools—effectively granting official sanction to Lutheran ideas. The apostolic succession was retained in Sweden during the Reformation. The adoption of Lutheranism was also one of the main reasons for the eruption of the Dacke War, a peasants uprising in Småland.

Finland

Denmark 
Under the reign of Frederick I (1523–33), Denmark remained officially Catholic. Frederick initially pledged to persecute Lutherans, yet he quickly adopted a policy of protecting Lutheran preachers and reformers, of whom the most famous was Hans Tausen. During his reign, Lutheranism made significant inroads among the Danish population. In 1526, Frederick forbade papal investiture of bishops in Denmark and in 1527 ordered fees from new bishops be paid to the crown, making Frederick the head of the church of Denmark. Frederick's son, Christian, was openly Lutheran, which prevented his election to the throne upon his father's death. In 1536, following his victory in the Count's War, he became king as Christian III and continued the Reformation of the state church with assistance from Johannes Bugenhagen. By the Copenhagen recess of October 1536, the authority of the Catholic bishops was terminated.

Faroe Islands

Iceland 

Luther's influence had already reached Iceland before King Christian's decree. The Germans fished near Iceland's coast, and the Hanseatic League engaged in commerce with the Icelanders. These Germans raised a Lutheran church in Hafnarfjörður as early as 1533. Through German trade connections, many young Icelanders studied in Hamburg. In 1538, when the kingly decree of the new Church ordinance reached Iceland, bishop Ögmundur and his clergy denounced it, threatening excommunication for anyone subscribing to the German "heresy". In 1539, the King sent a new governor to Iceland, Klaus von Mervitz, with a mandate to introduce reform and take possession of church property. Von Mervitz seized a monastery in Viðey with the help of his sheriff, Dietrich of Minden, and his soldiers. They drove the monks out and seized all their possessions, for which they were promptly excommunicated by Ögmundur.

United Kingdom

England

Church of England 

The separation of the Church of England from Rome under Henry VIII, beginning in 1529 and completed in 1537, brought England alongside this broad Reformation movement. Although Robert Barnes attempted to get Henry VIII to adopt Lutheran theology, he refused to do so in 1538 and burned him at the stake in 1540. Reformers in the Church of England alternated, for decades, between sympathies between Catholic tradition and Reformed principles, gradually developing, within the context of robustly Protestant doctrine, a tradition considered a middle way (via media) between the Catholic and Protestant traditions.

The English Reformation followed a different course from the Reformation in continental Europe. There had long been a strong strain of anti-clericalism. England had already given rise to the Lollard movement of John Wycliffe, which played an important part in inspiring the Hussites in Bohemia. Lollardy was suppressed and became an underground movement, so the extent of its influence in the 1520s is difficult to assess. The different character of the English Reformation came rather from the fact that it was driven initially by the political necessities of Henry VIII.

Henry had once been a sincere Catholic and had even authored a book strongly criticising Luther. His wife, Catherine of Aragon, bore him only a single child who survived infancy, Mary. Henry strongly wanted a male heir, and many of his subjects might have agreed, if only because they wanted to avoid another dynastic conflict like the Wars of the Roses.

Refused an annulment of his marriage to Catherine, King Henry decided to remove the Church of England from the authority of Rome. In 1534, the Act of Supremacy recognised Henry as "the only Supreme Head on earth of the Church of England". Between 1535 and 1540, under Thomas Cromwell, the policy known as the Dissolution of the Monasteries was put into effect. The veneration of some saints, certain pilgrimages and some pilgrim shrines were also attacked. Huge amounts of church land and property passed into the hands of the Crown and ultimately into those of the nobility and gentry. The vested interest thus created made for a powerful force in support of the dissolution.

There were some notable opponents to the Henrician Reformation, such as Thomas More and Cardinal John Fisher, who were executed for their opposition. There was also a growing party of reformers who were imbued with the Calvinistic, Lutheran and Zwinglian doctrines then current on the Continent. When Henry died he was succeeded by his Protestant son Edward VI, who, through his empowered councillors (with the King being only nine years old at his succession and fifteen at his death) the Duke of Somerset and the Duke of Northumberland, ordered the destruction of images in churches, and the closing of the chantries. Under Edward VI the Church of England moved closer to continental Protestantism.

Yet, at a popular level, religion in England was still in a state of flux. Following a brief Catholic restoration during the reign of Mary (1553–1558), a loose consensus developed during the reign of Elizabeth I, though this point is one of considerable debate among historians. This "Elizabethan Religious Settlement" largely formed Anglicanism into a distinctive church tradition. The compromise was uneasy and was capable of veering between extreme Calvinism on one hand and Catholicism on the other. But compared to the bloody and chaotic state of affairs in contemporary France, it was relatively successful, in part because Queen Elizabeth lived so long, until the Puritan Revolution or English Civil War in the seventeenth century.

English dissenters 

The success of the Counter-Reformation on the Continent and the growth of a Puritan party dedicated to further Protestant reform polarised the Elizabethan Age, although it was not until the 1640s that England underwent religious strife comparable to what its neighbours had suffered some generations before.

The early Puritan movement (late 16th–17th centuries) was Reformed (or Calvinist) and was a movement for reform in the Church of England. Its origins lay in the discontent with the Elizabethan Religious Settlement. The desire was for the Church of England to resemble more closely the Protestant churches of Europe, especially Geneva. The Puritans objected to ornaments and ritual in the churches as idolatrous (vestments, surplices, organs, genuflection), calling the vestments "popish pomp and rags" (see Vestments controversy). They also objected to ecclesiastical courts. Their refusal to endorse completely all of the ritual directions and formulas of the Book of Common Prayer, and the imposition of its liturgical order by legal force and inspection, sharpened Puritanism into a definite opposition movement.

The later Puritan movement, often referred to as dissenters and nonconformists, eventually led to the formation of various Reformed denominations.

The most famous emigration to America was the migration of Puritan separatists from the Anglican Church of England. They fled first to Holland, and then later to America to establish the English colony of Massachusetts in New England, which later became one of the original United States. These Puritan separatists were also known as "the Pilgrims". After establishing a colony at Plymouth (which became part of the colony of Massachusetts) in 1620, the Puritan pilgrims received a charter from the King of England that legitimised their colony, allowing them to do trade and commerce with merchants in England, in accordance with the principles of mercantilism. Civil and religious restrictions were most strictly applied by the Puritans of Massachusetts which saw various banishments applied to dissenters to enforce conformity, including the branding iron, the whipping post, the bilboes and the hangman’s noose. Notable individuals persecuted by the Puritans include Anne Hutchinson who was banished to Rhode Island during the Antinomian Controversy and Quaker Mary Dyer who was hanged in Boston for repeatedly defying a Puritan law banning Quakers from the colony. Dyer was one of the four executed Quakers known as the Boston martyrs. Executions ceased in 1661 when King Charles II explicitly forbade Massachusetts from executing anyone for professing Quakerism. In 1647, Massachusetts passed a law prohibiting any Jesuit Roman Catholic priests from entering territory under Puritan jurisdiction. Any suspected person who could not clear himself was to be banished from the colony; a second offence carried a death penalty.

The Pilgrims held radical Protestant disapproval of Christmas, and its celebration was outlawed in Boston from 1659 to 1681. The ban was revoked in 1681 by the English-appointed governor Edmund Andros, who also revoked a Puritan ban on festivities on Saturday nights. Nevertheless, it was not until the mid-19th century that celebrating Christmas became fashionable in the Boston region.

Wales 

Bishop Richard Davies and dissident Protestant cleric John Penry introduced Calvinist theology to Wales. In 1588, the Bishop of Llandaff published the entire Bible in the Welsh language. The translation had a significant impact upon the Welsh population and helped to firmly establish Protestantism among the Welsh people. The Welsh Protestants used the model of the Synod of Dort of 1618–1619. Calvinism developed through the Puritan period, following the restoration of the monarchy under Charles II, and within Wales' Calvinistic Methodist movement. However few copies of Calvin's writings were available before mid-19th century.

Scotland 

The Reformation in Scotland's case culminated ecclesiastically in the establishment of a church along reformed lines, and politically in the triumph of English influence over that of France. John Knox is regarded as the leader of the Scottish reformation.

The Reformation Parliament of 1560 repudiated the pope's authority by the Papal Jurisdiction Act 1560, forbade the celebration of the Mass and approved a Protestant Confession of Faith. It was made possible by a revolution against French hegemony under the regime of the regent Mary of Guise, who had governed Scotland in the name of her absent daughter Mary, Queen of Scots (then also Queen of France).

Although Protestantism triumphed relatively easily in Scotland, the exact form of Protestantism remained to be determined. The 17th century saw a complex struggle between Presbyterianism (particularly the Covenanters) and Episcopalianism. The Presbyterians eventually won control of the Church of Scotland, which went on to have an important influence on Presbyterian churches worldwide, but Scotland retained a relatively large Episcopalian minority.

Estonia

France 

Besides the Waldensians already present in France, Protestantism also spread in from German lands, where the Protestants were nicknamed Huguenots; this eventually led to decades of civil warfare.

Though not personally interested in religious reform, Francis I (reigned 1515–1547) initially maintained an attitude of tolerance, in accordance with his interest in the humanist movement. This changed in 1534 with the Affair of the Placards. In this act, Protestants denounced the Catholic Mass in placards that appeared across France, even reaching the royal apartments. During this time as the issue of religious faith entered into the arena of politics, Francis came to view the movement as a threat to the kingdom's stability.

Following the Affair of the Placards, culprits were rounded up, at least a dozen heretics were put to death, and the persecution of Protestants increased. One of those who fled France at that time was John Calvin, who emigrated to Basel in 1535 before eventually settling in Geneva in 1536. Beyond the reach of the French kings in Geneva, Calvin continued to take an interest in the religious affairs of his native land including the training of ministers for congregations in France.

As the number of Protestants in France increased, the number of heretics in prisons awaiting trial also grew. As an experimental approach to reduce the caseload in Normandy, a special court just for the trial of heretics was established in 1545 in the Parlement de Rouen. When Henry II took the throne in 1547, the persecution of Protestants grew and special courts for the trial of heretics were also established in the Parlement de Paris. These courts came to known as "La Chambre Ardente" ("the fiery chamber") because of their reputation of meting out death penalties on burning gallows.

Despite heavy persecution by Henry II, the Reformed Church of France, largely Calvinist in direction, made steady progress across large sections of the nation, in the urban bourgeoisie and parts of the aristocracy, appealing to people alienated by the obduracy and the complacency of the Catholic establishment.

French Protestantism, though its appeal increased under persecution, came to acquire a distinctly political character, made all the more obvious by the conversions of nobles during the 1550s. This established the preconditions for a series of destructive and intermittent conflicts, known as the Wars of Religion. The civil wars gained impetus with the sudden death of Henry II in 1559, which began a prolonged period of weakness for the French crown. Atrocity and outrage became the defining characteristics of the time, illustrated at their most intense in the St. Bartholomew's Day massacre of August 1572, when the Catholic party killed between 30,000 and 100,000 Huguenots across France. The wars only concluded when Henry IV, himself a former Huguenot, issued the Edict of Nantes (1598), promising official toleration of the Protestant minority, but under highly restricted conditions. Catholicism remained the official state religion, and the fortunes of French Protestants gradually declined over the next century, culminating in Louis XIV's Edict of Fontainebleau (1685), which revoked the Edict of Nantes and made Catholicism the sole legal religion of France, leading some Huguenots to live as Nicodemites. In response to the Edict of Fontainebleau, Frederick William I, Elector of Brandenburg declared the Edict of Potsdam (October 1685), giving free passage to Huguenot refugees and tax-free status to them for ten years.

In the late 17th century, 150,000–200,000 Huguenots fled to England, the Netherlands, Prussia, Switzerland, and the English and Dutch overseas colonies. A significant community in France remained in the Cévennes region. A separate Protestant community, of the Lutheran faith, existed in the newly conquered province of Alsace, its status not affected by the Edict of Fontainebleau.

Spain 

In the early 16th century, Spain had a different political and cultural milieu from its Western and Central European neighbours in several respects, which affected the mentality and the reaction of the nation towards the Reformation. Spain, which had only recently managed to complete the reconquest of the Peninsula from the Moors in 1492, had been preoccupied with converting the Muslim and Jewish populations of the newly conquered regions through the establishment of the Spanish Inquisition in 1478. The rulers of the nation stressed political, cultural, and religious unity, and by the time of the Lutheran Reformation, the Spanish Inquisition was already 40 years old and had the capability of quickly persecuting any new movement that the leaders of the Catholic Church perceived or interpreted to be religious heterodoxy. Charles V did not wish to see Spain or the rest of Habsburg Europe divided, and in light of continual threat from the Ottomans, preferred to see the Roman Catholic Church reform itself from within. This led to a Counter-Reformation in Spain in the 1530s. During the 1520s, the Spanish Inquisition had created an atmosphere of suspicion and sought to root out any religious thought seen as suspicious. As early as 1521, the Pope had written a letter to the Spanish monarchy warning against allowing the unrest in Northern Europe to be replicated in Spain. Between 1520 and 1550, printing presses in Spain were tightly controlled and any books of Protestant teaching were prohibited.

Between 1530 and 1540, Protestantism in Spain was still able to gain followers clandestinely, and in cities such as Seville and Valladolid adherents would secretly meet at private houses to pray and study the Bible. Protestants in Spain were estimated at between 1000 and 3000, mainly among intellectuals who had seen writings such as those of Erasmus. Notable reformers included Dr. Juan Gil and Juan Pérez de Pineda who subsequently fled and worked alongside others such as Francisco de Enzinas to translate the Greek New Testament into the Spanish language, a task completed by 1556. Protestant teachings were smuggled into Spain by Spaniards such as Julián Hernández, who in 1557 was condemned by the Inquisition and burnt at the stake. Under Philip II, conservatives in the Spanish church tightened their grip, and those who refused to recant such as Rodrigo de Valer were condemned to life imprisonment. In May 1559, sixteen Spanish Lutherans were burnt at the stake: fourteen were strangled before being burnt, while two were burnt alive. In October another thirty were executed. Spanish Protestants who were able to flee the country were to be found in at least a dozen cities in Europe, such as Geneva, where some of them embraced Calvinist teachings. Those who fled to England were given support by the Church of England.

The Kingdom of Navarre, although by the time of the Protestant Reformation a minor principality territoriality restricted to southern France, had French Huguenot monarchs, including Henry IV of France and his mother, Jeanne III of Navarre, a devout Calvinist.

Upon the arrival of the Protestant Reformation, Calvinism reached some Basques through the translation of the Bible into the Basque language by Joanes Leizarraga. As Queen of Navarre, Jeanne III commissioned the translation of the New Testament into Basque and Béarnese for the benefit of her subjects.

Molinism presented a soteriology similar to Protestants within the Roman Catholic Church.

Portugal 

During the Reformation era Protestantism was unsuccessful in Portugal, as its spread was frustrated for similar reasons to those in Spain.

Netherlands 

The Reformation in the Netherlands, unlike in many other countries, was not initiated by the rulers of the Seventeen Provinces, but instead by multiple popular movements which in turn were bolstered by the arrival of Protestant refugees from other parts of the continent. While the Anabaptist movement enjoyed popularity in the region in the early decades of the Reformation, Calvinism, in the form of the Dutch Reformed Church, became the dominant Protestant faith in the country from the 1560s onward. In the early 17th century internal theological conflict within the Calvinist church between two tendencies of Calvinism, the Gomarists and the liberal Arminians (or Remonstrants), resulted in Gomarist Calvinism becoming the de facto state religion.

Belgium 
The first two Lutheran martyrs were monks from Antwerp, Johann Esch and Heinrich Hoes, who were burned at the stake when they would not recant.

Harsh persecution of Protestants by the Spanish government of Philip II contributed to a desire for independence in the provinces, which led to the Eighty Years' War and, eventually, the separation of the largely Protestant Dutch Republic from the Catholic-dominated Southern Netherlands (present-day Belgium).

In 1566, at the peak of Belgian Reformation, there were an estimated 300,000 Protestants, or 20% of the Belgian population.

Latvia

Luxembourg

Luxembourg, a part of the Spanish Netherlands, remained Catholic during the Reformation era because Protestantism was illegal until 1768.

Hungary 

Much of the population of the Kingdom of Hungary adopted Protestantism during the 16th century. After the 1526 Battle of Mohács, the Hungarian people were disillusioned by the inability of the government to protect them and turned to the faith they felt would infuse them with the strength necessary to resist the invader. They found this in the teaching of Protestant reformers such as Martin Luther. The spread of Protestantism in the country was assisted by its large ethnic German minority, which could understand and translate the writings of Martin Luther. While Lutheranism gained a foothold among the German- and Slovak-speaking populations, Calvinism became widely accepted among ethnic Hungarians.

In the more independent northwest, the rulers and priests, protected now by the Habsburg monarchy, which had taken the field to fight the Turks, defended the old Catholic faith. They dragged the Protestants to prison and the stake wherever they could. Such strong measures only fanned the flames of protest, however. Leaders of the Protestants included Mátyás Dévai Bíró, Mihály Sztárai, István Szegedi Kis, and Ferenc Dávid.

Protestants likely formed a majority of Hungary's population at the close of the 16th century, but Counter-Reformation efforts in the 17th century reconverted a majority of the kingdom to Catholicism. A significant Protestant minority remained, most of it adhering to the Calvinist faith.

In 1558 the Transylvanian Diet of Turda decreed the free practice of both the Catholic and Lutheran religions, but prohibited Calvinism. Ten years later, in 1568, the Diet extended this freedom, declaring that "It is not allowed to anybody to intimidate anybody with captivity or expulsion for his religion". Four religions were declared to be "accepted" (recepta) religions (the fourth being Unitarianism, which became official in 1583 as the faith of the only Unitarian king, John II Sigismund Zápolya, r. 1540–1571), while Eastern Orthodox Christianity was "tolerated" (though the building of stone Orthodox churches was forbidden). During the Thirty Years' War, Royal (Habsburg) Hungary joined the Catholic side, until Transylvania joined the Protestant side.

Between 1604 and 1711, there was a series of anti-Habsburg uprisings calling for equal rights and freedom for all Christian denominations, with varying success; the uprisings were usually organised from Transylvania. The Habsburg-sanctioned Counter-Reformation efforts in the 17th century reconverted the majority of the kingdom to Catholicism.

The center of Protestant learning in Hungary has for some centuries been the University of Debrecen. Founded in 1538, the university was situated in an area of Eastern Hungary under Ottoman Turkish rule during the 1600s and 1700s, being allowed Islamic toleration and thus avoiding Counter-Reformation persecution.

Romania

Transylvania in what is today's Romania was a "dumping ground for undesirables" by the Habsburg monarchy. People who did not conform to the will of the Habsburgs and the leaders of the Catholic Church were forcibly sent there. Centuries of this practice allowed diverse Protestant traditions to emerge in Romania, including Lutheranism, Calvinism and Unitarianism.

Ukraine

Calvinism was popular among Hungarians who inhabited the southwestern parts of the present-day Ukraine. Their descendants are still there, such as the Sub-Carpathian Reformed Church.

Belarus

The first Protestant congregation was founded in Brest-Litovsk in the Reformed tradition, and the Belarusian Evangelical Reformed Church exists today.

Ireland 

The Reformation in Ireland was a movement for the reform of religious life and institutions that was introduced into Ireland by the English administration at the behest of King Henry VIII of England. His desire for an annulment of his marriage was known as the King's Great Matter. Ultimately Pope Clement VII refused the petition; consequently it became necessary for the King to assert his lordship over the church in his realm to give legal effect to his wishes. The English Parliament confirmed the King's supremacy over the Church in the Kingdom of England. This challenge to Papal supremacy resulted in a breach with the Roman Catholic Church. By 1541, the Irish Parliament had agreed to the change in status of the country from that of a Lordship to that of Kingdom of Ireland.

Unlike similar movements for religious reform on the continent of Europe, the various phases of the English Reformation as it developed in Ireland were largely driven by changes in government policy, to which public opinion in England gradually accommodated itself. However, a number of factors complicated the adoption of the religious innovations in Ireland; the majority of the population there adhered to the Catholic Church. However, in the city of Dublin the Reformation took hold under the auspices of George Browne, Archbishop of Dublin.

Italy 

Word of the Protestant reformers reached Italy in the 1520s but never caught on. Its development was stopped by the Counter-Reformation, the Inquisition and also popular disinterest. Not only was the Church highly aggressive in seeking out and suppressing heresy, but there was a shortage of Protestant leadership. No one translated the Bible into Italian; few tracts were written. No core of Protestantism emerged. The few preachers who did take an interest in "Lutheranism", as it was called in Italy, were suppressed or went into exile to northern countries where their message was well received. As a result, the Reformation exerted almost no lasting influence in Italy, except for strengthening the Catholic Church and pushing for an end to ongoing abuses during the Counter-Reformation.

Some Protestants left Italy and became outstanding activists of the European Reformation, mainly in the Polish–Lithuanian Commonwealth (e.g. Giorgio Biandrata, Bernardino Ochino, Giovanni Alciato, Giovanni Battista Cetis, Fausto Sozzini, Francesco Stancaro and Giovanni Valentino Gentile), who propagated Nontrinitarianism there and were chief instigators of the movement of Polish Brethren. Some also fled to England and Switzerland, including Peter Vermigli.

In 1532, the Waldensians, who had been already present centuries before the Reformation, aligned themselves and adopted the Calvinist theology. The Waldensian Church survived in the Western Alps through many persecutions and remains a Protestant church in Italy.

Polish–Lithuanian Commonwealth 

In the first half of the 16th century, the enormous Polish–Lithuanian Commonwealth was a country of many religions and Churches, including: Roman Catholics, Byzantine Orthodox, Armenian Oriental Orthodox, Ashkenazi Jews, Karaites, and Sunni Muslims. The various groups had their own juridical systems. On the eve of the Protestant Reformation, Christianity held the predominant position within the Kingdom of Poland and the Grand Duchy of Lithuania, and Catholicism received preferential treatment at the expense of the Eastern and Oriental Orthodox.

The Reformation first entered Poland through the mostly German-speaking areas in the country's north. In the 1520s Luther's reforms spread among the mostly German-speaking inhabitants of such major cities as Danzig (now Gdańsk), Thorn (now Toruń) and Elbing (now Elbląg). In Königsberg (now Kaliningrad), in 1530, a Polish-language edition of Luther's Small Catechism was published. The Duchy of Prussia, a vassal of the Polish Crown ruled by the Teutonic Knights, emerged as a key center of the movement, with numerous publishing houses issuing not only Bibles, but also catechisms, in German, Polish and Lithuanian. In 1525 the last Grand Master of the Teutonic Knights secularised the territory, became Lutheran, and established Lutheranism as the state church.

Lutheranism found few adherents among the other peoples of the two countries. Calvinism became the most numerous Protestant group because Calvin's teachings on the role of the state within religion appealed to the nobility (known as szlachta), mainly in Lesser Poland and the Grand Duchy of Lithuania. Several publishing houses were opened in Lesser Poland in the mid-16th century in such locations as Słomniki and Raków. At that time, Mennonites and Czech Brothers came to Poland. The former settled in the Vistula Delta where they used their agricultural abilities to turn parts of the delta into plodders. The latter settled mostly in Greater Poland around Leszno. Later on, Socinus and his followers emigrated to Poland. Originally the Reformed Church in Poland included both the Calvinists and the Anti-trinitarians (also known as the Socinians and the Polish Brethren); however, they eventually split due to an inability to reconcile their divergent views on the Trinity. Both Catholics and Orthodox Christians converts became Calvinists and the Anti-Trinitarians.

The Commonwealth was unique in Europe in the 16th century for its widespread tolerance confirmed by the Warsaw Confederation. This agreement granted religious toleration to all nobles: peasants living on nobile estates did not receive the same protections. In 1563, the Brest Bible was published (see also Bible translations into Polish). The period of tolerance came under strain during the reign of King Sigismund III Vasa (Zygmunt Wasa). Sigismund, who was also the King of Sweden until deposed, was educated by Jesuits in Sweden before his election as King of the Polish–Lithuanian Commonwealth. During his reign, he selected Catholics for the highest offices in the country. This created resentment amongst the Protestant nobility; however, the country did not experience a religiously motivated civil war. Despite concerted efforts, the nobility rejected efforts to revise or rescind the Confederation of Warsaw, and protected this agreement.

The Deluge, a 20-year period of almost continual warfare, marked the turning point in attitudes. During the war with Sweden, when King John Casimir (Jan Kazimierz) fled to Silesia, the Icon of Mary of Częstochowa became the rallying point for military opposition to the Swedish forces. Upon his return to the country Kihn John Casimir crowned Mary a Queen of Poland. Despite these wars against Protestant, Orthodox, and Muslim neighbours, the Confederation of Warsaw held with one notable exception. In the aftermath of the Swedish withdrawal and truce, attitudes throughout the nobility (Catholic, Orthodox, and Protestant) turned against the Polish Brethren. In 1658 the Polish Brethren were forced to leave the country. They were permitted to sell their immovable property and take their movable property; however, it is still unknown whether they received fair-market value for their lands. In 1666, the Sejm banned apostasy from Catholicism to any other religion, under penalty of death. Finally, in 1717, the Silent Sejm banned non-Catholics from becoming deputies of the Parliament.

The strategy the Catholic Church took towards reconverting the Polish–Lithuanian Commonwealth differed from its strategy elsewhere. The unique government (Poland was a republic where the citizen nobility owned the state) meant the king could not enforce a religious settlement even he if so desired. Instead the Catholic Church undertook a long and steady campaign of persuasion. In the Ruthenian lands (predominately modern day Belarus & Ukraine) the Orthodox Church also undertook a similar strategy. Additionally, the Orthodox also sought to join the Catholic Church (accomplished in the Union of Brześć [Brest]); however, this union failed to achieve a lasting, permanent, and complete union of the Catholics and Orthodox in the Polish–Lithuanian Commonwealth. An important component of the Catholic Reformation in Poland was education. Numerous colleges and universities were set up throughout the country: the Jesuits and Piarists were important in this regard but there were contributions of other religious orders such as the Dominicans. While in the middle of the 16th century the nobility mostly sent their sons abroad for education (the new German Protestant universities were important in this regard), by the mid-1600s the nobility mostly stayed home for education. The quality of the new Catholic schools was so great that Protestants willingly sent their children to these schools. Through their education, many nobles became appreciative of Catholicism or out-right converted. Even though the majority of the nobility were Catholic circa 1700, Protestants remained in these lands and pockets of Protestantism could be found outside the German-speaking lands of the former Polish–Lithuanian Commonwealth into the 20th century.

Among the most important Protestants of the Commonwealth were Mikołaj Rej, Marcin Czechowic, Andrzej Frycz Modrzewski and Symon Budny.

For more information see the following:

 Kot, Stanislas. Socinianism in Poland: The Social and Political Ideas of the Polish Antitrinitarians in the Sixteenth and Seventeenth Centuries. Translated by Earl Morse Wilbur. Bacon Hill Boston: Starr King Press, 1957.
 Tazbir, Janusz. A State without Stakes: Polish Religious Toleration in the Sixteenth and Seventeenth Centuries. Translated by A. T. Jordan. Panstwowy Instytut Wydawniczy, 1973.
 Kłoczowski, Jerzy. A History of Polish Christianity. [Dzieje Chrześcijaństwa Polskiego].English. Cambridge, U.K.; New York: Cambridge University Press, 2000.
 Gudziak, Borys A. Crisis and Reform: The Kyivan Metropolitanate, the Patriarchate of Constantinople, and the Genesis of the Union of Brest. Harvard Series in Ukrainian Studies, 2001.
 Teter, Magda. Jews and Heretics in Catholic Poland: A Beleaguered Church in the Post-Reformation Era. Cambridge: Cambridge University Press, 2009.
 Nowakowska, Natalia. King Sigismund of Poland and Martin Luther: The Reformation before Confessionalization. Oxford, United Kingdom: Oxford University Press, 2018.

Moldova 

The Reformation was very insignificant in what is now Moldova and saw single congregations of Hussitism and Calvinism being founded across Besserabia. During the Reformation era, Moldova was repeatedly invaded.

Slovenia 

Primož Trubar is notable for consolidating the Slovene language and is considered to be the key figure of Slovenian cultural history, in many aspects a major Slovene historical personality. He was the key figure of the Protestant Church of the Slovene Lands, as he was its founder and its first superintendent. The first books in Slovene, Catechismus and Abecedarium, were written by Trubar.

Slovakia

At one point in history, the majority of Slovaks (~60%) were Lutherans. Calvinism was popular among the Hungarians who inhabited the southernmost parts of what is now Slovakia. Back then, Slovakia used to be a part of the Kingdom of Hungary. The Counter-Reformation implemented by the Habsburgs severely damaged Slovakian Protestantism, although in the 2010s Protestants are still a substantial minority (~10%) in the country.

Croatia 
Lutheranism reached northern parts of the country.

Serbia 

Vojvodina turned partially Lutheran.

Greece

The Protestant teachings of the Western Church were also briefly adopted within the Eastern Orthodox Church through the Greek Patriarch Cyril Lucaris in 1629 with the publishing of the Confessio (Calvinistic doctrine) in Geneva. Motivating factors in their decision to adopt aspects of the Reformation included the historical rivalry and mistrust between the Greek Orthodox and the Roman Catholic Churches along with their concerns of Jesuit priests entering Greek lands in their attempts to propagate the teachings of the Counter-Reformation to the Greek populace. He subsequently sponsored Maximos of Gallipoli's translation of the New Testament into the Modern Greek language and it was published in Geneva in 1638. Upon Lucaris's death in 1638, the conservative factions within the Eastern Orthodox Church held two synods: the Synod of Constantinople (1638) and Synod of Iași (1642) criticising the reforms and, in the 1672 convocation led by Dositheos, they officially condemned the Calvinistic doctrines.

In 2019, Christos Yannaras told Norman Russell that although he had participated in the Zoë movement, he had come to regard it as Crypto-Protestant.

Ottoman Empire

Spread 
The Reformation spread throughout Europe beginning in 1517, reaching its peak between 1545 and 1620. The greatest geographical extent of Protestantism occurred at some point between 1545 and 1620. In 1620, the Battle of White Mountain defeated Protestants in Bohemia (now the Czech Republic) who sought to have the 1609 Letter of Majesty upheld.
 

.

The Thirty Years' War began in 1618 and brought a drastic territorial and demographic decline when the House of Habsburg introduced counter-reformational measures throughout their vast possessions in Central Europe. Although the Thirty Years' War concluded with the Peace of Westphalia, the French Wars of the Counter-Reformation continued, as well as the expulsion of Protestants in Austria.
According to a 2020 study in the American Sociological Review, the Reformation spread earliest to areas where Luther had pre-existing social relations, such as mail correspondents, and former students, as well as where he had visited. The study argues that these social ties contributed more to the Reformation's early breakthroughs than the printing press.

Conclusion and legacy 
There is no universal agreement on the exact or approximate date the Reformation ended. Various interpretations emphasise different dates, entire periods, or argue that the Reformation never really ended. However, there are a few popular interpretations. Peace of Augsburg in 1555 officially ended the religious struggle between the two groups and made the legal division of Christianity permanent within the Holy Roman Empire, allowing rulers to choose either Lutheranism or Roman Catholicism as the official confession of their state. It could be considered to end with the enactment of the confessions of faith. Other suggested ending years relate to the Counter-Reformation or the 1648 Peace of Westphalia. From a Catholic perspective, the Second Vatican Council called for an end to the Counter-Reformation.
In the history of theology or philosophy, the Reformation era ended with the Age of Orthodoxy. The Orthodox Period, also termed the Scholastic Period, succeeded the Reformation with the 1545–1563 Council of Trent, the 1562 Anglican Thirty-nine Articles, the 1580 Book of Concord, and other confessions of faith. The Orthodox Era ended with the development of both Pietism and the Enlightenment.
 The Peace of Westphalia might be considered to be the event that ended the Reformation.
 Some historians argue that the Reformation never ended as new churches have splintered from the Catholic Church (e.g., Old Catholics, Polish National Catholic Church, etc.), as well as all the various Protestant churches that exist today. No church splintering from the Catholic Church since the 17th century has done so on the basis of the same issues animating the Reformation, however.

Thirty Years' War: 1618–1648 

The Reformation and Counter-Reformation era conflicts are termed the European wars of religion. In particular, the Thirty Years' War (1618–1648) devastated much of Germany, killing between 25% and 40% of its entire population. The Catholic House of Habsburg and its allies fought against the Protestant princes of Germany, supported at various times by Denmark, Sweden and France. The Habsburgs, who ruled Spain, Austria, the Crown of Bohemia, Hungary, Slovene Lands, the Spanish Netherlands and much of Germany and Italy, were staunch defenders of the Catholic Church. Some historians believe that the era of the Reformation came to a close when Catholic France allied itself with Protestant states against the Habsburg dynasty.

Two main tenets of the Peace of Westphalia, which ended the Thirty Years' War, were:
 All parties would now recognise the Peace of Augsburg of 1555, by which each prince would have the right to determine the religion of his own state, the options being Catholicism, Lutheranism, and now Calvinism (the principle of ).
 Christians living in principalities where their denomination was not the established church were guaranteed the right to practice their faith in public during allotted hours and in private at their will.

The treaty also effectively ended the Papacy's pan-European political power. Pope Innocent X declared the treaty "null, void, invalid, iniquitous, unjust, damnable, reprobate, inane, empty of meaning and effect for all times" in his apostolic brief Zelo Domus Dei. European sovereigns, Catholic and Protestant alike, ignored his verdict.

Consequences of the Reformation 
Six princes of the Holy Roman Empire and rulers of fourteen Imperial Free Cities, who issued a protest (or dissent) against the edict of the Diet of Speyer (1529), were the first individuals to be called Protestants. The edict reversed concessions made to the Lutherans with the approval of Holy Roman Emperor Charles V three years earlier. The term Protestant, though initially purely political in nature, later acquired a broader sense, referring to a member of any Western church which subscribed to the main Protestant principles. Today, Protestantism constitutes the second-largest form of Christianity (after Catholicism), with a total of 800 million to 1 billion adherents worldwide or about 37% of all Christians. Protestants have developed their own culture, with major contributions in education, the humanities and sciences, the political and social order, the economy and the arts and many other fields. The following outcomes of the Reformation regarding human capital formation, the Protestant ethic, economic development, governance, and "dark" outcomes have been identified by scholars:

Human capital formation 
 Higher literacy rates.
 Lower gender gap in school enrollment and literacy rates.
 Higher primary school enrollment.
 Higher public spending on schooling and better educational performance of military conscripts.
 Higher capability in reading, numeracy, essay writing, and history.

Protestant ethic 
 More hours worked.
 Divergent work attitudes of Protestant and Catholics.
 Fewer referendums on leisure, state intervention, and redistribution in Swiss cantons with more Protestants.
 Lower life satisfaction when unemployed.
 Pro-market attitudes.
 Income differences between Protestants and Catholics.

Economic development 

 Different levels of income tax revenue per capita, % of labor force in manufacturing and services, and incomes of male elementary school teachers.
 Growth of Protestant cities.
 Greater entrepreneurship among religious minorities in Protestant states.
 Different social ethics.
Industrialization.

Governance 
 The Reformation has been credited as a key factor in the development of the state system.
 The Reformation has been credited as a key factor in the formation of transnational advocacy movements.
 The Reformation impacted the Western legal tradition.
 Establishment of state churches.
 Poor relief and social welfare regimes.
 James Madison noted that Martin Luther's doctrine of the two kingdoms marked the beginning of the modern conception of separation of church and state.
 The Calvinist and Lutheran doctrine of the lesser magistrate contributed to resistance theory in the Early Modern period and was employed in the United States Declaration of Independence.
 Reformers such as Calvin promoted mixed government and the separation of powers, which governments such as the United States subsequently adopted.

Other outcomes 
 Witch trials became more common in regions or other jurisdictions where Protestants and Catholics contested the religious market.
 Christopher J. Probst, in his book Demonizing the Jews: Luther and the Protestant Church in Nazi Germany (2012), shows that a large number of German Protestant clergy and theologians during the Nazi Third Reich used Luther's hostile publications towards the Jews and Judaism to justify at least in part the anti-Semitic policies of the National Socialists.
 In its decree on ecumenism, the Second Vatican Council of Catholic bishops declared that by contemporary dialogue that, while still holding views as the One, Holy, Catholic, and Apostolic Church, between the churches "all are led to examine their own faithfulness to Christ's will for the Church and accordingly to undertake with vigor the task of renewal and reform" (Unitatis Redintegratio, 4).

Historiography 
Margaret C. Jacob argues that there has been a dramatic shift in the historiography of the Reformation. Until the 1960s, historians focused their attention largely on the great leaders and theologians of the 16th century, especially Luther, Calvin, and Zwingli. Their ideas were studied in depth. However, the rise of the new social history in the 1960s led to looking at history from the bottom up, not from the top down. Historians began to concentrate on the values, beliefs and behavior of the people at large. She finds, "in contemporary scholarship, the Reformation is now seen as a vast cultural upheaval, a social and popular movement, textured and rich because of its diversity."

Music and art 

Painting and sculpture
Northern Mannerism
Lutheran art
German Renaissance Art
Swedish art
English art
Woodcuts
Art conflicts
Beeldenstorm

Building
Influence on church architecture

Literature
Elizabethan
Metaphysical poets
Propaganda
Welsh
Scottish
Anglo-Irish
German
Czech
Swiss
Slovak
Sorbian
Romanian
Danish
Faroese
Norwegian
Swedish
Finnish
Icelandic
Dutch Renaissance and Golden Age
Folklore of the Low Countries
16th century Renaissance humanism
16th century in poetry
16th century in literature
English Renaissance theatre

Musical forms
Hymnody of continental Europe
Music of the British Isles
Hymn tune
Lutheran chorale
Lutheran hymn
Anglican church music
Exclusive psalmody
Anglican chant
Homophony vs. Polyphony

Liturgies
Reformed worship
Calvin's liturgy
Formula missae
Deutsche Messe
Ecclesiastical Latin
Lutheran and Anglican Mass in music
Cyclic mass vs. Paraphrase mass
Roman vs. Sarum Rites
Sequence (retained by Lutherans, mostly banned by Trent)

Hymnals
First and Second Lutheran hymnals
First Wittenberg hymnal
Swenske songer
Thomissøn's hymnal
Ausbund
Book of Common Prayer
Metrical psalters
Souterliedekens
Book of Common Order
Genevan Psalter
Scottish Psalter

Secular music
English Madrigal School
Greensleeves
German madrigals
Moravian traditional music
Meistersinger

Partly due to Martin Luther's love for music, music became important in Lutheranism. The study and practice of music was encouraged in Protestant-majority countries. Songs such as the Lutheran hymns or the Calvinist Psalter became tools for the spread of Protestant ideas and beliefs, as well as identity flags. Similar attitudes developed among Catholics, who in turn encouraged the creation and use of music for religious purposes.

See also 

 Women in the Protestant Reformation
 Anti-Catholicism
 Criticism of Protestantism
 Book of Concord
 Catholic-Protestant relations
 Concordat of Worms
 Confessionalization
 Counter-Reformation, the Catholic response
 European wars of religion
 Free Grace theology
 Historiography of religion
 List of Protestant Reformers
 Propaganda during the Reformation
 Protestant culture
 Protestantism in Germany
 Proto-Protestantism
 The Reformation and its influence on church architecture
 European City of the Reformation

Notes

References

Bibliography

Further reading

Surveys 

 Appold, Kenneth G. The Reformation: A Brief History (2011) online
 Collinson, Patrick. The Reformation: A History (2006)
 Elton, Geoffrey R. and Andrew Pettegree, eds. Reformation Europe: 1517–1559 (1999) excerpt and text search
  Elton, G.R., ed. The New Cambridge Modern History, Vol. 2: The Reformation, 1520–1559 (1st ed. 1958) online free
 Gassmann, Günther, and Mark W. Oldenburg. Historical dictionary of Lutheranism (Scarecrow Press, 2011).
 Hillerbrand, Hans J. The Protestant Reformation (2nd ed. 2009)
 Hsia, R. Po-chia, ed. A Companion to the Reformation World (2006)
 Lindberg, Carter. The European Reformations (2nd ed. 2009)
  Mourret, Fernand. History of the Catholic Church (vol 5 1931) online free; pp. 325–516; by French Catholic scholar
 
 
 Sascha O. Becker, Steven Pfaff and Jared Rubin. Causes and Consequences of the Protestant Reformation (2015) online
 Reeves, Michael. The Unquenchable Flame: Discovering the Heart of the Reformation (2nd ed. 2016)
 Spitz, Lewis William (2003). The Protestant Reformation: 1517–1559.

Theology

 Bagchi, David, and David C. Steinmetz, eds. The Cambridge Companion to Reformation Theology (2004)
 
 Barrett, Matthew, and Michael Horton. Reformation Theology: A Systematic Summary (2017).
 Braaten, Carl E. and Robert W. Jenson. The Catholicity of the Reformation. Grand Rapids: Eerdmans, 1996. .
 Cunningham, William. The Reformers and the Theology of the Reformation (2013).
 Payton, James R., Jr. Getting the Reformation Wrong: Correcting Some Misunderstandings (IVP Academic, 2010)

Primary sources in translation 

 Fosdick, Harry Emerson, ed. Great Voices of the Reformation [and of other putative reformers before and after it]: an Anthology, ed., with an introd. and commentaries, by Harry Emerson Fosdick. (Modern Library, 1952). xxx, 546 pp.
 Janz, Denis, ed. A Reformation Reader: Primary Texts with Introductions (2008) excerpt and text search
 Littlejohn, Bradford, and Jonathan Roberts eds. Reformation Theology: A Reader of Primary Sources with Introductions (2018).
 Luther, Martin Luther's Correspondence and Other Contemporary Letters, 2 vols., tr. and ed. by Preserved Smith, Charles Michael Jacobs, The Lutheran Publication Society, Philadelphia, Pa. 1913, 1918. vol.2 (1521–1530) from Google Books. Reprint of Vol. 1, Wipf & Stock Publishers (March 2006). .
 Spitz, Lewis W. The Protestant Reformation: Major Documents. St. Louis: Concordia Publishing House, 1997. .

Historiography 

 
 
 
 
  443 pp. excerpt
 
 
 
 
 
 
 Howard, Thomas A. and Mark A. Noll, eds. Protestantism after 500 Years (Oxford UP, 2016) pp. 384. 
 
 
 
 
 Kooi, Christine. "The Reformation in the Netherlands: Some Historiographic Contributions in English." Archiv für Reformationsgeschichte 100.1 (2009): 293–307.
 
 
 
 
 
 
 
 
 
 Walsham, Alexandra. "Toleration, Pluralism, and Coexistence: The Ambivalent Legacies of the Reformation." Archiv für Reformationsgeschichte-Archive for Reformation History 108.1 (2017): 181–190. Online

External links 

 Internet Archive of Related Texts and Documents
 16th Century Reformation Reading Room: Extensive online resources, Tyndale Seminary
 The Reformation Collection From the Rare Book and Special Collections Division at the Library of Congress
 An ecumenical official valuation by Lutherans and Catholics 500 years later
 The Historyscoper
 

 
Anti-Catholicism
Reformation
Schisms in Christianity
Schisms from the Catholic Church